Aunt Bam's Place is a 2011 American stage play created, produced, written, and directed by Tyler Perry. It stars Cassi Davis as Aunt Bam and Melonie Daniels as Gloria. The live performance released on DVD (June 12, 2012) was recorded live in Atlanta at the Cobb Energy Performing Arts Centre on August 30 - 31, 2011.

Plot
One weekend, Aunt Bam's nephew-in-law Stewart is granted a court-ordered visitation with his children. Although his new, much-younger wife Mona is a bundle of nerves, Stewart seizes the opportunity to reconnect with his children, whom he loves dearly. Then their mother, his ex-wife Gloria, shows up drunk. It will take Madea's partner-in-crime, Bam, to tame this situation and set a few things straight.

Cast
 Cassi Davis as Aunt Bam
 Melonie Daniels as Gloria Peterson 
 Paris Bennett as Denise Peterson 

 Jeffery Lewis as Bryson Peterson
 Taral Hicks as Mona Peterson 
 Maurice Lauchner as Stewart Peterson

The Band 

 Ronnie Garrett - Musical Director & Bass Guitar
 Derek Scott - Guitar
 Marcus Williams - Drums
 Michael Burton - Saxophone
 Justin Gilbert - Keyboards
 Aaron Draper - Percussion
 Natalie Ragins - Keyboards
 Melvin Jones - Trumpet
 Rashad Henderson - Background Vocals
 Raquel Britton - Background Vocals
 Tasha Danae - Background Vocals

Musical Numbers 
All songs written and/or produced by Tyler Perry and Elvin D. Ross.
 Gospel Medley

 "Were You There" - Denise
 "Walk With Me" - Stewart
 "I'll Fly Away" - Mona

 "You Ain't Got No Love" - Aunt Bam
 "Son" - Stewart
 "I Wish I Knew" - Denise
 "But It's Okay" - Mona
 "Broken, Battered, Still Blessed" - Bryson
 "You Don't Understand" - Gloria
 "I Don't Feel No Ways Tired" - Aunt Bam, Mona, Stewart, Gloria and Company

External links
Tyler Perry Official website

Plays by Tyler Perry

2011 plays
African-American plays
Plays about families